The Recreation Park Complex is located in Chehalis, Washington in the city's South Market district near the Green Hill School. The venue contains four distinct parks within its borders, providing recreation for athletics, walking, swimming, and playground activities.

Park Areas

Recreation Park

Located in Chehalis's South Market district, the park is the largest part of the Recreation Park Complex. Geared mostly for athletics, the area incorporates softball and youth baseball fields, picnic areas, and concrete walking paths. The Virgil R. Lee Community Building, built in 1955, and the Fred Hess Kitchen are also located on the property and can be rented. 

Land for the park, totaling 13-acres (5.3 ha), was donated in 1945 and officially transferred by deed to the city in 1953, with the park built and completed in 1954. A small playground was situated on the grounds, with a rose garden eventually added in the 1960s. Little League Baseball was played at the park until the 1970s. In 1959, a tree stump meant to be a platform for a visit from President William McKinley was transferred to the park. Known in Chehalis as the "McKinley Stump", it was removed in 2007 due to severe damage from carpenter ants.

Beginning in 2015, feasibility studies were undertaken to plan ahead for a future renovation of the area. Attempts to relocate the ballfields from Recreation Park by building new fields at Stan Hedwall Park and subsequently transferring baseball and softball competitions there, did not proceed.

A renovation, consisting of several phases, began in August 2019. The cost of the plan was $4 million, with significant funding coming from the Chehalis Foundation, the National Park Service, and a Youth Athletic Facilities grant from Washington state. An $800,000 donation came from a trust created by a Chehalis family.  Other funds were raised from a variety of grants, local volunteer drives, and state funds; the four ballfields were named after large donors. The project consisted of adding artificial turf to the ballfields, sod replacement, fixing drainage issues, a new irrigation system, installing all-weather walkways, and upgrading the concession stand and dugouts.

Due to the COVID-19 pandemic and requirements for social distancing, the reopening of the park was postponed several times between 2020 and 2021. The official grand reopening was held in August 2021.

The park continues to be the home field of the W.F. West Bearcats softball team, an overall four-time state champion. A "Music in the Park" festival is held every summer at the park.

Penny Playground

The effort to build Penny Playground began in 1992 through community initiative and fundraising, with a non-profit corporation created to oversee the project that year. From inception until completion, donations of $120,000 were collected from diverse businesses and charities, with a majority of funds gathered from Chehalis residents, including $1,200 by students from the Chehalis Middle School. The sale of $30,000 worth of timber from Duffy Park was designated for the project. In 1993, with a volunteer workgroup numbering 2,000 people, the playground was constructed in 5 days at a cost of $80,000. A time capsule was buried in 1994 and reopened in 2019.  The name of the park was chosen from submissions by local schoolchildren: the "penny" moniker representing the fundraising drive to collect pennies to help pay for the construction.

A restoration of the park was necessary by 2019 as the original timber equipment, having surpassed its 20-year lifespan, had begun to deteriorate from dry rot, with additional concerns over the toxic chemicals in the treated wood, a lack of spare parts, and not meeting current safety requirements. The process began with a groundbreaking ceremony in October 2019. Funds totaling $1.3 million for the project were raised by assorted government departments within Washington state and Lewis County, local service groups such as the Kiwanis and Rotary International, and local businesses and residents. Students from several elementary schools in Chehalis raised $12,000; Lintott Elementary School was responsible for over $8,000. Residents could donate money to the project with the Chehalis Foundation by purchasing commemorative pennies that would be hung on a donation fence encompassing the playground. The new ADA compliant playground was furnished with all-weather equipment, a perimeter path, cushioning artificial turf, and sculptures, with a new parking lot and improved sidewalks around the area.

The reopening of the playground was postponed several times in 2020-2021 due to the COVID-19 pandemic and further delayed by $150,000 in damages from a hit-and-run vehicular accident. The park reopened in May 2021 after repairs from the crash were completed and additional improvements were made to protect the area from any similar future incident.

Gail and Carolyn Shaw Aquatics Center

The center was constructed to replace the original Chehalis Community Pool that was built in 1959. A renovation project begun in 2012 morphed into a necessary replacement of the facility due to requirements for safety, appeal, and compliance with the American With Disabilities Act. The breadth of the proposal increased further due in large part to considerable donations from the local community, and an influx of a combined grant and budget item of $750,000 from the state government. Additional financial support soon followed by prominent Chehalis people and businesses, notably Orin C. Smith and the center's moniker, Gail and Carolyn Shaw. The initial cost was finalized at $2.7 million. The aquatic center would open in August 2014 with an official ribbon cutting the following month.

Maintenance and upgrades took place in 2019 and 2021 to make repairs, resurface the pool, and to increase the square footage and shading of the pool deck.

Chet and Henrietta Rhodes Spray Park

The Chet and Henrietta Rhodes Spray Park is adjacent to the Gail and Carolyn Shaw Aquatics Center. It is open to the public and free of charge. Completed in 2007, local fundraisers produced $120,000 for the project that was built as a "fun and safe space for young children’s outdoor water play". The former wading pool was removed and sponsorship bricks were added to the wall surrounding the play area. Initially given the title "Kiddy Spray Pool", the area would be named after the parents of a local donor.

See also
 Parks and recreation in Chehalis, Washington

Notes

References 

Parks in Washington (state)